The 2005–06 Serie C2 was the football league season of Italian Serie C2 for the years 2005 and 2006. It was divided into two phases: the regular season, played from August 28, 2005 to May 7, 2006, and the playoff phase.  Once the regular season was over teams placed 2nd to 5th entered a playoff to determine the second team in each division to be promoted to Serie C1.  At the same time, teams placed 14th to 17th entered a playout for the right to remain in Serie C2 the following season.

As usual, Serie C2 was composed by three divisions, whose teams were divided geographically. Division C2/A was mainly composed by Northern Italy and Sardinian teams, whereas division C2/B included North-Central and Central Italy teams, with the exception of two teams from Campania (Benevento and Cavese), and division C2/C was represented by teams hailing from Central-Southern Italy and Sicily.

Teams finishing first in the regular season, plus one team winning the playoff round from each division were promoted to Serie C1; teams finishing last in the regular season, plus two relegation playoff losers from each division were relegated to Serie D, losing also their professional club status. In all, six teams were promoted to Serie C1, and nine teams were relegated to Serie D.

Teams
The season originally features 9 teams from Serie D, 6 teams from Serie C1 and 41 teams from last season Serie C2. However, COVISOC had expelled Calcio Como S.p.A., A.C. Imolese S.r.l., Polisportiva Rosetana Calcio S.r.l., A.S. Sora S.r.l., Vis Pesaro 1898 S.r.l. and Serie D Group B winner U.S. Canzese. Moreover, Monza, Chieti, Juve Stabia and San Marino Calcio were promoted to Serie C1 to fill the vacancies. The 10 vacancies was replaced by U.S. Città di Jesolo and Calcio Lecco 1912 from Serie D, as well as phoenix clubs that recreated by Lodo Petrucci: Andria, Benevento, Reggiana, SPAL and Venezia were relegated from 2005–06 Serie C1 to Serie C2, as well as on 19 August Biellese was readmitted from Serie D, which the team was relegated. Overall, the changes made the division had restored from 56 teams to 54 teams, or 18 teams in 3 groups, features 1 team from Serie B, 6 teams from Serie C1, 37 teams from Serie C2 and 10 teams from Serie D.

Group A

Standings

Serie C2/A
Final table

Serie C2/B
Final table

Serie C2/C
Final table

Promotion and relegation playoffs

Serie C2/A

Promotion
Promotion playoff semifinals
First legs played May 21, 2007; return legs played May 28, 2007

Promotion playoff finals
First leg played June 4, 2007; return leg played June 11, 2007

Ivrea promoted to Serie C1

Relegation
Relegation playoffs
First legs played May 21, 2007; return legs played May 28, 2007

Jesolo and Portosummaga relegated to Serie D

Serie C2/B

Promotion
Promotion playoff semifinals
First legs played May 21, 2007; return legs played May 28, 2007

Promotion playoff finals
First leg played June 4, 2007; return leg played June 11, 2007

Sassuolo promoted to Serie C1

Relegation
Relegation playoffs
First legs played May 27, 2007; return legs played June 3, 2007

Castel San Pietro and Montevarchi relegated to Serie D

Serie C2/C

Promotion
Promotion playoff semifinals
First legs played May 21, 2007; return legs played May 28, 2007

Promotion playoff finals
First leg played June 4, 2007; return leg played June 11, 2007

Taranto promoted to Serie C1

Relegation
Relegation playoffs
First legs played May 27, 2007; return legs played June 3, 2007

Latina and Modica relegated to Serie D

References

Serie C2 seasons
Italy
4